Heathrow Terminal 4 station can refer to the following:

Heathrow Terminal 4 railway station, a National Rail station
Heathrow Terminal 4 tube station, a London Underground station